In aviation, approach surveillance radar (ASR or SRA) is a type of radar instrument approach provided with active assistance from air traffic control. The only airborne radio equipment required for radar approaches is a functioning radio transmitter and receiver. The radar controller vectors the aircraft to align it with the runway centerline. The controller continues the vectors to keep the aircraft on course until the pilot can complete the approach and landing by visual reference to the surface.

There are two types of radar approaches: Precision (PAR) and Surveillance (ASR).
A radar approach may be given to any aircraft upon request and may be offered to pilots of aircraft in distress or to expedite traffic; however, an ASR might not be approved unless there is an ATC operational requirement, or in an unusual situation or emergency. Acceptance of a PAR or ASR by a pilot does not waive the prescribed weather minimums for the airport or for the particular aircraft operator concerned. The decision to make a radar approach when the reported weather is below the established minimums rests with the pilot. PAR and ASR minimums are published on separate pages in the FAA's terminal procedures publication.

Precision approach (PAR)
This is one in which a controller provides highly accurate navigational guidance in
azimuth and elevation to a pilot. Pilots are given headings to fly, to direct them to, and keep their aircraft aligned
with the extended centerline of the landing runway. They are told to anticipate glidepath interception
approximately 10–30 seconds before it occurs and when to start descent. The published decision height will be given
only if the pilot requests it. If the aircraft is observed to deviate above or below the glidepath, the pilot is given
the relative amount of deviation by use of terms “slightly” or “well” and is expected to adjust the aircraft rate
of descent/ascent to return to the glidepath. Trend information is also issued with respect to the elevation of
the aircraft and may be modified by the terms “rapidly” and “slowly” (e.g., “well above glidepath, coming
down rapidly”). Range from touchdown is given at least once each mile. If an aircraft is observed by the
controller to proceed outside of specified safety zone limits in azimuth and/or elevation and continue to operate
outside these prescribed limits, the pilot will be directed to execute a missed approach or to fly a specified
course unless the pilot has the runway environment (runway, approach lights, etc.) in sight. Navigational
guidance in azimuth and elevation is provided to the pilot until the aircraft reaches the published decision height. Advisory
course and glidepath information is furnished by the controller until the aircraft passes over the landing
threshold, at which point the pilot is advised of any deviation from the runway centerline. Radar service is
automatically terminated upon completion of the approach.

Surveillance approach
This is one in which a controller, in ASR, provides navigational guidance in azimuth only.
The pilot is furnished headings to fly to align the aircraft with the extended centerline of the landing runway.
Since the radar information used for surveillance approach is considerably less precise than that used for a
precision approach, the accuracy of the approach will not be as great and higher minimums will apply.
Guidance in elevation is not possible but the pilot will be advised when to commence descent to the minimum descent altitude (MDA) or, if appropriate, to an intermediate stepdown fix Minimum Crossing Altitude (MCA) and subsequently to the prescribed MDA. In addition, the pilot will be advised of the location of the MAPt prescribed for the procedure
and the aircraft position each mile on final from the runway, airport, heliport, or MAPt, as appropriate. If
requested by the pilot, recommended altitudes will be issued at each mile, based on the descent gradient
established for the procedure, down to the last mile that is at or above the MDA. Normally, navigational
guidance will be provided until the aircraft reaches the MAPt. Controllers will terminate guidance and instruct
the pilot to execute a missed approach unless at the MAPt the pilot has the runway, airport, or heliport in sight
or, for a helicopter point-in-space approach, the prescribed visual reference with the surface is established.
Also, if, at any time during the approach the controller considers that safe guidance for the remainder of the
approach cannot be provided, the controller will terminate guidance and instruct the pilot to execute a missed
approach. Similarly, guidance termination and missed approach will be effected upon pilot request and, for
civil aircraft only, controllers may terminate guidance when the pilot reports the runway, airport, heliport or
visual surface route (point-in-space approach) in sight or otherwise indicates continued guidance is not
required. Radar service is automatically terminated at the completion of a radar approach.

Pilots should check radar services at the airport they desire to land in order to determine if radar approaches are available.  Radar approaches are used a lot by many navy/marine corps pilots as a default to emergencies, thus many navy/marine pilots are proficient in Radar approaches.

Air traffic control
Types of final approach (aviation)